James Davis (dates of birth and death unknown) was an English cricketer. Davis' batting style is unknown, though it is known he played as a wicket-keeper.

Davis made his first-class debut for England against Sussex in 1843 at the Royal New Ground, Brighton. He next appeared in first-class cricket in 1848 for the Surrey Club against the Marylebone Cricket Club at Lord's, before making two further first-class appearances for Surrey, both against Middlesex in 1850. He batted six times in his four matches, scoring just a single run and being dismissed for a duck four times. Behind the stumps he made a single catch and stumping.

References

External links
James Davis at ESPNcricinfo
James Davis at CricketArchive

English cricketers
Surrey Club cricketers
Surrey cricketers
Wicket-keepers